Paschalococos disperta, the Rapa Nui palm or Easter Island palm, formerly Jubaea disperta, was the native cocoid palm species of Easter Island. It disappeared from the pollen record circa AD 1650.

Taxonomy
It is not known whether the species is distinct from Jubaea, but there is no evidence that it was Jubaea either, as the soft tissues used for identification of cocoid genera have not been preserved. All that remain are pollen from lake beds, hollow endocarps (nuts) found in a cave, and casts of root bosses. Partly to avoid giving credence to the common but speculative assumption that the palms were Jubaea chilensis and used as rollers to move the moai statues of Easter Island, John Dransfield assigned the species to a new genus. The assignment is not accepted by the World Checklist of Selected Plant Families, which does not list the genus Paschalococos, nor by The Plant List which regards the name as "unresolved".

Usage and extinction
Human overpopulation in the period AD 800 to 1600 led to extinction of the Rapa Nui palm. Hogan believes that loss of the Rapa Nui palm along with other biota contributed to the collapse of society on Easter Island. Dransfield suggests that the trees became extinct as they were cut down for the edible palm hearts as food supplies ran out for an island Human overpopulation. It is also likely that many palms were cut down to build canoes for fishing.  Another possibility is the Polynesian rat, brought in by settlers arriving between AD 800 and 1000, consumed the nuts of the palm, leaving insufficient numbers to reseed the island.

Despite the extinction of the tree, this palm appears to have been represented two hundred years later in the Rongorongo script of Easter Island with the glyph .

Further reading
John Dransfield. 2008. Palm & Cycad Society of Australia: Paschalococos disperta
C. Michael Hogan (2008) Chilean Wine Palm: Jubaea chilensis, GlobalTwitcher.com, ed. N. Stromberg

References

Cocoseae
Flora of Easter Island
Extinct plants
Species made extinct by human activities
Holocene extinctions
Monotypic Arecaceae genera
Plant extinctions since 1500
Controversial taxa